The Aschach is a river of Upper Austria. It is a left tributary of the Innbach near Alkoven.

References

External links
www.lfvooe.at

Rivers of Upper Austria
Rivers of Austria